The Hatz Classic is an American homebuilt biplane, designed by Billy Dawson and produced by the Makelan Corporation of New Braunfels, Texas. The aircraft is supplied as a kit or, alternatively, in the form of plans for amateur construction.

Design and development
The Hatz Classic is a development of the Hatz CB-1. The major differences from the CB-1 are that the fuselage is more rounded, it mounts a larger engine, it uses push-pull tubes instead of control cables for the ailerons and elevators and it has aluminum ailerons. As well the seats are relocated in the fuselage and reclined to provide more leg room and comfort for the occupants.

The resulting aircraft features a strut-braced biplane layout, two-seats-in-tandem accommodation in separate open cockpits with individual windshields, fixed conventional landing gear with wheel pants and a single engine in tractor configuration.

The aircraft fuselage is made from welded 4130 steel tubing, while the wings are of wooden construction all covered in doped aircraft fabric.

The Hatz Classic is capable of basic aerobatics, including loops, rolls and hammerheads. The manufacturer estimates the construction time from the supplied kit as 1000 hours.

Operational history
The design won several awards, including Reserve Grand Champion - Plans Built at Airventure 1996, Grand Champion Experimental and Reserve Grand Champion Open Cockpit - Biplane at the 1997 Biplane Expo and Grand Champion - Plans Built at AirVenture 1997.

By 1998 the company reported that five kits had been sold and three aircraft were completed and flying.

In September 2014 twelve examples were registered in the United States with the Federal Aviation Administration.

Specifications (Hatz Classic)

See also
List of aerobatic aircraft

References

External links

Hatz Classic
1990s United States sport aircraft
Single-engined tractor aircraft
Biplanes
Homebuilt aircraft
Aerobatic aircraft